Ophisops agarwali, the Agarwal's lacerta or Agarwal's snake-eye, is a species of lizard found in India.

Distribution
India

References

Ophisops
Reptiles of India
Reptiles described in 2020